Temnozaga is a genus of sea snails, marine gastropod mollusks in the family Sutilizonidae.

Species
Species within the genus Temnozaga include:

 Temnozaga parilis McLean, 1989

References

External links

Sutilizonidae
Monotypic gastropod genera